Larry Wayne Brown (born April 14, 1947) is a Canadian former professional ice hockey defenceman who played in the National Hockey League (NHL) with the New York Rangers, Detroit Red Wings, Philadelphia Flyers and Los Angeles Kings.

Career statistics

Awards
MJHL Second All-Star Team (1967)

External links
 

1947 births
Brandon Wheat Kings players
Buffalo Bisons (AHL) players
Canadian ice hockey defencemen
Cincinnati Stingers (CHL) players
Detroit Red Wings players
Fort Worth Texans players
Houston Apollos players
Ice hockey people from Manitoba
Living people
Los Angeles Kings players
New York Rangers players
Omaha Knights (CHL) players
Philadelphia Flyers players
Richmond Robins players
Saskatoon Blades players
Sportspeople from Brandon, Manitoba
Springfield Indians players
Springfield Kings players